"Chłapowo" is also the name of a district of Władysławowo on the Baltic coast.

Chłapowo  is a village in the administrative district of Gmina Dominowo, within Środa Wielkopolska County, Greater Poland Voivodeship, in west-central Poland.

The village has a population of 150.

References

Villages in Środa Wielkopolska County